Pete Cassidy (June 20, 1934 – December 18, 2020) was an American college basketball coach who served as head coach of the Cal State Northridge Matadors from 1971 to 1996.

Cassidy played basketball and baseball at San Fernando Valley State (now California State University, Northridge), graduating in 1960. After stints coaching California high school teams, Cassidy returned to his alma mater as an assistant under Jerry Ball. He was promoted to head coach upon Ball's departure in 1971 and spent the next 25 years as the school's head coach, compiling a record of 334–337. Cassidy was the coach as the Matadors transitioned to NCAA Division I status in 1990. He was fired following the 1995–96 season.

Cassidy died on December 18, 2020 at age 86.

References

External links
Division I coaching record @ basketball-reference.com

1934 births
2020 deaths
American men's basketball coaches
American men's basketball players
Basketball coaches from California
Basketball players from California
Cal State Northridge Matadors baseball players
Cal State Northridge Matadors men's basketball coaches
Cal State Northridge Matadors men's basketball players
College men's basketball head coaches in the United States
High school basketball coaches in California